Godzilla and the Titans is an upcoming American monster television series created by Chris Black and Matt Fraction. It is intended to be a part of Warner Bros. and Legendary's MonsterVerse multimedia franchise and shared fictional universe. The series is slated to be released via streaming exclusively on Apple TV+.

Premise 
Following the thunderous battle between Godzilla and the Titans that leveled San Francisco and the shocking new reality that monsters are real, the series explores one family's journey to uncover its buried secrets and a legacy linking them to the secret organization known as Monarch.

Cast 
 Anna Sawai as Cate
 Kiersey Clemons as May
 Wyatt Russell
 Kurt Russell
 Josh Collins
 Ren Watabe as Kentaro
 Joe Tippett as Tim
 Elisa Lasowski as Duvall
 Mari Yamamoto
 Anders Holm

Production

Development 
Following the success of Godzilla vs. Kong, discussions commenced on ways that the MonsterVerse could be expanded beyond feature films. Legendary proposed a live-action series, and amongst the potential investors, Apple TV+ expressed immediate interest and negotiated a deal and green-lit the series in January 2022. The project will be a joint-venture production between Legendary Television, Safehouse Pictures and Toho. Chris Black will serve as showrunner. In May, Matt Shakman was hired to direct the first two episodes in addition to executive producing.

Casting 
In June, Anna Sawai, Ren Watabe, Kiersey Clemons, Joe Tippett and Elisa Lasowski were cast in the series. In July, Kurt Russell and Wyatt Russell were added to the cast, with Mari Yamamoto joining in August. In September 2022, Anders Holm joined the cast while also revealing the show's title.

Filming 
In July 2022, it was revealed that principal photography had commenced in Vancouver, British Columbia, Canada. Two weeks of filming occurred in Japan in August.

References

External links 
 

MonsterVerse
Upcoming television series
Television shows filmed in Vancouver
Television series by Legendary Television
Apple TV+ original programming
Godzilla television series
Television shows filmed in Japan